Zlatá Harmonie (Golden Harmony) is a Czech music award for the best Czech classical recording of the year.

Czech music awards